Ondu Hennu Aaru Kannu is a 1980 Indian Kannada-language film directed by V. Madhusudhana Rao, produced by C. H. Prakash Rao and written by M. D. Sundar. The film has an ensemble cast including Ananth Nag, Shankar Nag, Ambareesh, Fatafat Jayalaxmi and Balakrishna. The film had a musical score by S. Rajeswara Rao.

Cast
 Ananth Nag 
 Shankar Nag
 Ambareesh
 Thoogudeepa Srinivas
 Balakrishna
 Fatafat Jayalaxmi
 Musuri Krishnamurthy
 Leelavathi
 Uma Shivakumar
 Chindodi Leela
 K. S. Ashwath
 Shakti Prasad

Soundtrack
The music of the film was composed by S. Rajeswara Rao with lyrics penned by Chi. Udaya Shankar.

Track list

References

External links
 
 Song at youtube

1980 films
1980s Kannada-language films
Indian action films
Films directed by V. Madhusudhana Rao
Films scored by S. Rajeswara Rao
1980 action films